Halfdan Wilhelmsen (March 11, 1864 – November 18, 1923) was a Norwegian shipowner and consul.

Wilhelmsen was born in Tønsberg, the son of the shipowner Wilhelm Wilhelmsen and his wife Catharina Fredrikke Lorentzen.

After graduating from business school, he was employed in brokerage and shipowners' offices in England, Germany, and France. In 1887 he became the co-owner of his father's company, Wilh. Wilhelmsen. He built this up into the largest shipping company in the Nordic region, and he was one of the pioneers in the transition from sailing ships to steamships.

Wilhelmsen served as the British and Danish Consul in Tønsberg. In 1909 he was one of the founders of the Norwegian Shipowners' Association. Among other assignments, Wilhelmsen was Norway's delegate at the Paris Peace Conference in 1919 and in US government loan negotiations. In 1915 he was appointed knight first class of the Order of St. Olav. He was also a knight of the Danish Order of the Dannebrog and the French Legion of Honour. Halfdan Wilhelmsen Avenue (Halfdan Wilhelmsens allé) in Tønsberg is named after him.

In 1891 he married Ragnhild Oppen (1869–1952) from Larvik, and their daughter Else Werring was born in 1905. Wilhelmsen died after a short illness in 1923.

References

Further reading
 Den Kongelige norske Sankt Olavs orden 1847–1947, utgitt av ordenskanselliet ved O. Delphin Amundsen.1947.  Oslo: Grøndahl & Søns Forlag.
 Sven A. Solberg. 2001. Halfdan Wilhelmsen. Mannen og striden etter ham. Oslo: Andresen & Butenschøn.

Norwegian businesspeople in shipping
Order of Saint Olav
People from Tønsberg
Knights of the Order of the Dannebrog
1864 births
1923 deaths